Andrew Watson (born 3 September 1959) is a Scottish former professional footballer and coach.

During his playing career, Aberdeen-born Watson had spells at Aberdeen, Leeds United, Heart of Midlothian and Hibernian.  As a coach, he has worked with clubs in Scotland and England, and has been part of the Scottish national team management setup in two separate spells.

Career

Player
Beginning his professional career with his hometown club Aberdeen under manager Alex Ferguson, Watson was a winner of the 1979–80 Scottish Premier Division title and the 1982–83 Scottish Cup, and was also an unused substitute in the 1983 European Cup Winners' Cup Final victory. However he was never a regular starter in that strong Dons team and left the club at the end of that season.

Watson joined Leeds United for a fee of £60,000, brought to the club by Scottish manager Eddie Gray, and was a starting player at Elland Road in his one full season in England's second tier. As the following campaign unfolded he again found himself on the bench and decided to move on. After his spell in Yorkshire, he returned to Scotland and signed for Hearts in a £70,000 transfer; at the Tynecastle club he was part of the squad which came within minutes of winning the 1985–86 Scottish Premier Division. He took no part in that season's Scottish Cup Final defeat.

He switched across Edinburgh to city rivals Hibernian for £30,000, where he featured regularly for one season at Easter Road before he was forced to retire through injury aged just 29.

Coach
He joined the coaching staff at Hibs under Alex Miller and was persuaded by Alex McLeish, his former teammate at Aberdeen, to be his assistant at Motherwell in 1994. He later re-joined McLeish in moving to Hibernian and Rangers, where he was assistant manager until the end of the 2005–06 season.

From January 2007 he was one of McLeish's assistants with the Scotland national side, and in November 2007 followed McLeish when the latter was appointed manager of Birmingham City. On 21 May 2013 Watson was appointed first team coach at Notts County, but he was sacked on 27 October 2013, along with manager Chris Kiwomya.

Watson joined Northern Premier Division side Ilkeston FC during the 2015 close season as an assistant head coach and technical director, working with head coach Gavin Strachan. After Strachan left the club in October 2015, Watson was appointed head coach. In October 2016, he was appointed as assistant coach to Gordon Strachan (father of Gavin and another former Aberdeen teammate in the 1980s) at the Scottish national team alongside fellow coaches Mark McGhee and Gary McAllister, after the departure of Stuart McCall.

References

External links
 
 Scotland U21 stats at Fitbastats

1959 births
Aberdeen F.C. players
Association football midfielders
Birmingham City F.C. non-playing staff
Heart of Midlothian F.C. players
Hibernian F.C. non-playing staff
Hibernian F.C. players
Leeds United F.C. players
Living people
Motherwell F.C. non-playing staff
Notts County F.C. non-playing staff
Rangers F.C. non-playing staff
Scotland under-21 international footballers
Scottish Football League players
Scottish football managers
Scottish footballers
Footballers from Aberdeen
English Football League players
Ilkeston F.C. managers